The 1994–95 season was Mansfield Town's 58th season in the Football League and 22nd in the Third Division they finished in 6th position with 65 points and lost to local rivals Chesterfield in the play-offs.

Final league table

Results

Football League Third Division

Football League Third Division play-offs

FA Cup

League Cup

League Trophy

Squad statistics
 Squad list sourced from

References
General
 Mansfield Town 1994–95 at soccerbase.com (use drop down list to select relevant season)

Specific

Mansfield Town F.C. seasons
Mansfield Town